The 2016 Morocco Tennis Tour – Casablanca II was a professional tennis tournament played on clay courts. It was the second edition of the tournament which was part of the 2016 ATP Challenger Tour. It took place in Casablanca, Morocco, between 10 and 15 October 2016.

Singles main-draw entrants

Seeds

 1 Rankings are as of October 3, 2016.

Other entrants
The following players received wildcards into the singles main draw:
  Andrej Martin
  Reda Karakhi
  Amine Ahouda
  Khalid Allouch

The following player received entry using a special exemption:
  Stefanos Tsitsipas

The following players received entry from the qualifying draw:
  Gianluca Mager
  Carlos Taberner
  Maxime Janvier
  Danilo Petrović

The following player entered as a lucky loser:
  Bernabé Zapata Miralles

Champions

Singles

  Maxime Janvier def.  Stefanos Tsitsipas, 6–4, 6–0.

Doubles

  Roman Jebavý /  Andrej Martin def.  Dino Marcan /  Antonio Šančić, 6–4, 6–2.

References

Morocco Tennis Tour - Casablanca II